Serhiy Volodymyrovych Varlamov (born July 21, 1978) is a Ukrainian former professional ice hockey player. He played for the Calgary Flames and St. Louis Blues of the National Hockey League (NHL).

Playing career

Varlamov came to North America to play junior hockey with the Swift Current Broncos of the Western Hockey League (WHL).  In 1998, he won the Bob Clarke Trophy as the WHL's top scorer with 119 points.  He was also named the Four Broncos Memorial Trophy winner as the league's player of the year, and won the CHL Player of the Year award.  He signed with the Calgary Flames as a free agent in 1996 and spent three seasons in the Flames system from 1999 until 2001 when he was traded to the St. Louis Blues. After spending a year in the Vancouver Canucks organization, Varlamov signed with Ak Bars Kazan of the Russian Super League in 2004 and has also played with HC Sibir Novosibirsk, Severstal Cherepovets, SKA Saint Petersburg and HC Dinamo Minsk.

International play
Internationally, Varlamov played with the Ukraine men's national ice hockey team at the 2002 Winter Olympics and at three World Championships: 2000, 2004 and 2005.

Career statistics

Regular season and playoffs

International

Awards and achievements
 Named to the WHL East First All-Star Team in 1998

References

External links
 

1978 births
Living people
Ak Bars Kazan players
Calgary Flames players
Expatriate ice hockey players in Russia
HC Budivelnyk players
HC Dinamo Minsk players
HC Donbass players
HC Sibir Novosibirsk players
Ice hockey players at the 2002 Winter Olympics
Manitoba Moose players
Olympic ice hockey players of Ukraine
Saint John Flames players
Severstal Cherepovets players
SKA Saint Petersburg players
Sokil Kyiv players
St. Louis Blues players
Swift Current Broncos players
Ukrainian expatriate sportspeople in Canada
Ukrainian expatriate sportspeople in the United States
Ukrainian ice hockey left wingers
Undrafted National Hockey League players
Worcester IceCats players